Ričardas Gavelis (official November 8, 1950; actual October 8, 1950 in Vilnius, Lithuania – August 18, 2002) was a writer, playwright, and journalist.

Life and career
Ričardas Gavelis graduated from Druskininkai high school in 1968. In 1973 he graduated with a degree in theoretical physics from Vilnius University. From 1973 to 1977 he worked at the physics institute of the Lithuanian Academy of Sciences.

From 1978 to 1980 Gavelis worked in the editorial departments of the magazines Mokslas ir gyvenimas and Pergalė; from 1992 to 2002 he worked as a news analyst for the daily newspaper Respublika and the weekly Veidas.

Gavelis was the author of Vilniaus pokeris (translated as Vilnius Poker) and several other novels and collections of short stories. His work is characterized by a mix of fantasy, eroticism, philosophical ponderings on the human condition, and psychological insight. Vilnius Poker, first published in 1989 and the most famous of his novels, deals with a mysterious force called "They" which Gavelis described in an interview as "a force within people that is responsible for the formation of totalitarian systems." The story consists of the events of a single week in October told by four different narrators, one of them a dog.

Along with Algimantas Puipa, Gavelis co-authored the screenplay for the film Forest of the Gods (2005), original title Dievų miškas, adapted from the novel of the same name by Balys Sruoga.

Gavelis's works have been translated into English, Latvian, French, Polish, Finnish, German, Macedonian and Belarusian.

Bibliography
 Neprasidėjusi šventė, short stories, Vilnius:  , 1976
 Įsibrovėliai, short stories, Vilnius: Vaga, 1982
 Nubaustieji, short stories, Vilnius: Vaga, 1987
 Vilniaus pokeris, novel, Vilnius: Vaga, 1989
 Jauno žmogaus memuarai, novel, Vilnius: Vaga, 1991. - 140 p
 Vilniaus džiazas, novel, Vilnius: Vaga, 1993
 Paskutinioji žemės žmonių karta, novel, Vilnius: Vaga, 1995
 Taikos balandis, short stories, Vilnius: Alma littera, 1995. - 146 p.
 Prarastų godų kvartetas, novel, Vilnius: Tyto alba, 1997 - 228 p. 
 Septyni savižudybių būdai, novel, Vilnius: Tyto alba, 1999
 Sun–Tzu gyvenimas šventame Vlniaus mieste, novel, Vilnius: Tyto alba, 2002. - 290 p.
Translated into English:
 Handless and A Report on Ghosts, short stories, in Come Into My Time: Lithuania in Prose Fiction, 1970-90, ed. Violeta Kelertas. Urbana: University of Illinois, 1992, 
Vilnius Poker, translation of Vilniaus pokeris. Rochester, NY: Open Letter Press, 2009. Translated by Elizabeth Novickas.  Reissued in paperback by Pica Pica Press, 2016, 
Memoirs of a Life Cut Short, translation of Jauno žmogaus memuarai. Glasgow: Vagabond Voices, 2018. Translated by Jayde Will. 
Sun-Tzu's Life in the Holy City of Vilnius, translation of Sun-Tzu gyvenimas šventame Vlniaus mieste. Flossmoor, IL: Pica Pica Press, 2019. Translated by Elizabeth Novickas. 

Translated into French:
Vilnius Poker, translation of Vilniaus pokeris, Arles : Monsieur Toussaint Louverture, 2014. Translated by Margarita Le Borgne. 

Translated into Macedonian:
 „Покер во Вилнус", translation of "Vilniaus pokeris", Antolog, 2013,

References

External links
 Vilnius Review
 Ričardas Gavelis
 Excerpt from Sun-Tzu's Life in the Holy City of Vilnius
 Lithuanian Culture Institute - Ričardas Gavelis
 Lithuanian Professional Writers - Ričardas Gavelis
 International Literature Festival Berlin

1950 births
2002 deaths
Burials at Antakalnis Cemetery
Lithuanian writers
Lithuanian novelists
Lithuanian journalists
Lithuanian male writers
Vilnius University alumni
Writers from Vilnius
20th-century novelists
20th-century journalists